Shawn Daniels may refer to:

 Shawn Daniels (born 1979), American basketball player
 Shawn Daniels (Canadian football) (born 1966), Canadian football player

See also 
 LaShawn Daniels, American songwriter
 Sean Danielsen (born 1982), singer and guitarist for American alternative rock band Smile Empty Soul